Gianni Mina (born 9 February 1992 in Les Abymes, Guadeloupe, France) is a French professional tennis player.

Tennis career

Juniors
On the junior circuit, Mina reached the No. 1 combined world ranking in March 2010. He finished runner-up to eventual 2009 International Tennis Federation (ITF) World Junior Champion Daniel Berta in the 2009 French Open final; won international junior tournaments in Beaulieu-sur-Mer and Istres, and the Boys' 18s singles at the year-end Dunlop Orange Bowl in Key Biscayne, becoming the second Frenchman to win the title in the event's history, after Guy Forget in 1982.

Pro tour
He reached his highest ATP rankings of World No. 219 in singles in May 2015, and World No. 646 in doubles in November 2011. Mina is coached by former French players Aloïs Beust and Olivier Ramos.
Mina was given a wildcard for the 2010 French Open where he lost in the first round to four-time champion Rafael Nadal in three consecutive sets.

Mina has been given the nickname "Baby Monfils" because of his similar appearance to fellow Frenchman and professional tennis player Gaël Monfils.

Career titles

Singles (3)

References

External links

 
 

1992 births
Living people
French male tennis players
French people of Guadeloupean descent